Lightwood's law is the principle that, in medicine, bacterial infections will tend to localise while viral infections will tend to spread. This is based on the observation that while bacterial sepsis tends, despite affecting the whole body, to have a clear site of origin or 'focus', the opposite may be true of viral infections.  There may be multiple sites across the body which are affected including dermatological manifestations, respiratory symptoms and gastrointestinal symptoms.

This principle is by no means infallible and in clinical practice a variety of diagnostic tests are used to distinguish between bacterial and viral infections.

References

 Medical terminology
Diseases and disorders
 Microbiology
Eponyms
Adages